is a Japanese football player for Sagan Tosu.

Club statistics

References

External links

Profile at Sagan Tosu

1992 births
Living people
National Institute of Fitness and Sports in Kanoya alumni
Association football people from Mie Prefecture
Japanese footballers
J1 League players
J2 League players
Sagan Tosu players
Shonan Bellmare players
Albirex Niigata players
Association football midfielders